"daily-daily Dream' is J-pop singer Kotoko's thirteenth single and was released on August 26, 2009. The song was used as the second opening theme for the second season of Hayate the Combat Butler, making this her third tie-in with the anime series.

The single came in a limited CD+DVD edition (GNCV-0005) and a regular CD-only edition (GNCV-0006). The DVD contained the promotional video for "daily-daily Dream".

Track listing 
daily-daily Dream—5:07
Lyrics: Kotoko
Composition/Arrangement: C.G mix
Message—5:07
Composition/Lyrics: Kotoko
Arrangement: SORMA No.1
daily-daily Dream (instrumental) -- 5:07
Message (instrumental) -- 5:04

Chart and sales

References

2009 singles
2009 songs
Kotoko (singer) songs
Hayate the Combat Butler songs
Song recordings produced by I've Sound
Songs with lyrics by Kotoko (musician)